The 2008 Champs Sports Bowl was the 19th edition of the college football bowl game that was played on Saturday, December 27, 2008, at the Citrus Bowl in Orlando, Florida.  The game, which had a 4:30 PM US EST kickoff and was broadcast on ESPN, pitted the Wisconsin Badgers against the Florida State Seminoles. At the end, the Florida State Seminoles were the winners, 42–13.

Game summary

Team Stats; Wisconsin - First downs 16 , FSU- First downs 23. Wisconsin- Rush-Yds-TD's 38-201-0, FSU- Rush-Yds-TD's 38-134-2.Wisconsin- Cmp-Attd-Yd-TD-INT 9-16-132-1-0. FSU- Cmp-Attd-Yd-TD-INT 23-37-276-2-0. Wisconsin- Total yards 333, FSU- Total Yards 410. Wisconsin- Fumbles-Lost 3-3, FSU-Fumbles-Lost 0-0. Wisconsin- Turnovers 3, FSU-Turnovers 0.
Wisconsin- Penalties-Yards 2-25, FSU- Penalties-Yards 7-85.

Kick&Punt returns: Player- Michael Ray Garvin , FSU- ret:4, Yd's:71, Avg: 17.8, TD: 0. Bert Reed, FSU- ret:2, Yd's:23, Avg:11, TD:0. Ochuko Jenije, FSU- ret:2, Yd's:6, Avg: 3.0, Td:0. Antonio Fenelus, Wisconsin- ret:2, Yd's: 50, Avg: 25.0, Td:0. Blake Sorensen Wisconsin- ret:1, Yd's:11, Avg:11.0, Td:0. Bill Rentmeester Wisconsin- ret:1, Yd's:1, Avg:1.0, Td:0. David Gilreath Wisconsin- ret:1, Yd's:3, Avg:3.0, TD:0.

Florida State's Graham Gano was able to kick three punts that died or went out of bounds inside Wisconsin's  3-yard line in the first quarter and a 58-yarder that was returned for 3 yards to the Wisconsin 7. He finished the game with 5 punts averaging 48.2 yards. He also drew a roughing the kicker penalty that extended a Florida State scoring drive (Replay revealed that he had not been touched). Gano was also the team's kicker and winner of the 2008 Lou Groza Award.

References

Champs Sports Bowl
Cheez-It Bowl
Florida State Seminoles football bowl games
Wisconsin Badgers football bowl games
American football in Orlando, Florida
December 2008 sports events in the United States
Champs Sports Bowl
2000s in Orlando, Florida